Daniel A. Lomino is an American production designer and art director. He was nominated for an Academy Award in the category Best Art Direction for the film Close Encounters of the Third Kind.

Selected filmography
 Close Encounters of the Third Kind (1977)
 Child's Play (1988)

References

External links

American production designers
American art directors
Year of birth missing (living people)
Living people